"Mountain Man" is a song recorded by Canadian country artist Dean Brody. It was the fourth single off Brody's fourth studio album Crop Circles.

Commercial performance
"Mountain Man" reached a peak of number 13 on Billboard Canada Country chart for the week of November 15, 2014, marking a career lowest charting entry at the time. It also peaked at number 96 on the Canadian Hot 100 one week earlier. It has been certified Gold by Music Canada.

Music video
The official music video for "Mountain Man" was directed by Dan LeMoyne and premiered on September 26, 2014.

Charts

Certifications

References

2013 songs
2014 singles
Dean Brody songs
Songs written by Dean Brody
Open Road Recordings singles